The Bracław Voivodeship (Braclavśke vojevodstvo) was a unit of administrative division of the Polish–Lithuanian Commonwealth. Created in 1566 as part of the Grand Duchy of Lithuania, it was passed to the Crown of Poland in 1569 following the Union of Lublin. After partitions of Poland in 1793 the voivodeship was taken by the Russian Empire and replaced with the Bratslav Viceroyalty.

In 1648-57 the territory of voivodeship was a part of Cossack Hetmanate following the Khmelnytsky Uprising and Truce of Andrusovo, while in 1672-99 it became part of Ottoman Ukraine which was a vassal Ottoman Empire (see: Treaty of Buchach and Treaty of Karlowitz).

Overview
Together with the Podole Voivodeship it formed the historical province of Podolia and part of a bigger Lesser Poland Province of the Polish Crown.

Officially, the capital of the voivodeship was in Braclaw (today Bratslav), but local voivodes also resided in Winnica (Vinnytsia). It was divided into County of Braclaw and County of Winnica. The County of Braclaw itself was divided into two districts—Braclaw and Zwinogrodek (some sources claim there was a separate County of Zwinogrodek). In 1791, the Great Sejm also created Boh County (Polish: powiat nadbohski), but it was never created due to the Polish–Russian War of 1792. Braclaw Voivodeship had two senators—the Voivode and the Castellan of Braclaw. It also had six deputies to the Sejm—two from Braclaw County, two from Winnica County, and two from District of Zwinogrodek. Local sejmiks took place in Winnica. Today the region belongs to Ukraine and Transnistria in Moldova.

Zygmunt Gloger in his monumental book Historical Geography of the Lands of Old Poland gives a detailed description of Braclaw Voivodeship:

After the Union of Lublin, the province of Podolia was annexed by the Kingdom of Poland. Soon afterwards, Ukrainian Podolia, located lower than Podole Voivodeship, between the Dniestr and the Boh rivers, was turned into Braclaw Voivodeship. It had three castles at Braclaw, Winnica and Zwinogrod (...) In 1570, a special royal commission was created to mark the borders of the voivodeship. Its western boundary was marked by the Murachwa river, and in the southeast, it was separated from Wallachia by the Dniestr. The commission marked northern border of the voivodeship along the Black Tatar Trail, and to settle arguments between Braclaw and Kijow Voivodeships, King Stefan Batory in 1584 stated that boundary line was to be marked by the Uhorski Tykicz river (...)

In the late 16th century, most of Braclaw Voivodeship was a depopulated wild field. Political and social life existed only in the agricultural belt, located in the immediate vicinity of royal castles. Settlers however began to move into the desert, even along southern border of the province, in the area called Pobereze (...) After the Union of Lublin, when Ukrainian lands were annexed by the Crown of the Kingdom of Poland, life became more organized, with Polish-style starostas, voivodes, nobility, sejmiks, and courts (...) 

The County of Winnica was smaller, but more populated. It had the area of 200 sq. miles, in northwestern corner of the voivodeship, along the Boh river. The County of Braclaw had the area of 420 sq. miles, and consisted of two districts - Braclaw and Zwinogrod. The district of Zwinogrod covered the desert of the Blue Waters (see also Battle of Blue Waters), but due to destruction of the Zwinogrod Castle, it did not emerge as a separate county (...) In 1584, Stefan Batory divided this area between Braclaw and Kijow Voivodeship, along the Uhorski Tykicz river (...)

In 1569, first voivode of Braclaw was Prince Roman Sanguszko, while first castellan was Knyaz Jedrzej Kapusta. In 1589 Polish Sejm ordered that all official documents in Braclaw Voivodeship should be written in Old East Slavic language (...) The voivodeship had two senators (the voivode and the castellan of Braclaw), six deputies to the Sejm, and two deputies to the Lesser Poland Tribunal at Lublin. Furthermore, like in neighbouring Podole Voivodeship, Braclaw had its own border judges, who cooperated with officials of the Ottoman Porte and the Crimean Khanate, solving conflicts between citizens of the two countries (...)

In 1598 the Sejm ordered that all courts and sejmiks be moved from Braclaw to Winnica. As a result, Winnica came to be regarded the capital of the voivodeship. Since in the 18th century the population of the region grew, in 1791 the Sejm created another county, called Boh County, increasing number of deputies from the voivodeship from six to eight. After the Partitions of Poland, Russian authorities created Braclaw Governorate (1793 - 1796), whose lands were then divided between Podolia Governorate, Volhynian Governorate, and Kiev Governorate (...) 

According to the 1625 census, Braclaw Voivodeship had 285 villages, but its population grew so fast that in the early 1790s, the number of villages grew to 1,500 (...) Before the Union of Lublin, there were some 30 castles, forts and strongholds in the province. Fifty years after the union, the number of castles grew significantly. Most of them were private, with the strongest one being Uman (...) In the 18th century, the voivodeship had several grand residences of Polish magnates, among them was Zofiowka of the Potocki family, located in close proximity to Uman.

Municipal government
Voivodeship Governor (Wojewoda) seat:
 Bracław (Bratslav)

Regional council (sejmik generalny) for all Ruthenian lands
 Sądowa Wisznia (Sudova Vyshnia)

Regional council (sejmik poselski i deputacki) seats:
 Winnica (Vinnytsia)

Administrative division
 Bracław County (Powiat bracławski), Bracław (Bratslav)
 Winnica County (Powiat winnicki), Winnica (Vinnytsia)
 Zwinogrodek District or Zwinogrodek County (powiat zwinogrodzki),
 Boh County (powiat nadbohski), created in 1791,

Voivodes
 Roman Sanguszko (16th century)
 Aleksander Zasławski (1628–?)
 Stanisław "Rewera" Potocki (1631–1636)
 Adam Kisiel (1647–?)
 Andrzej Potocki (1662–?)
 Stanisław Lubomirski (1764–?)

Neighbouring Voivodeships and regions
 Podole Voivodeship
 Kijów Voivodeship
 Jedysan
 Moldavia

Sources
 Braclaw Voivodeship, description by Zygmunt Gloger
Central European Superpower, Henryk Litwin, BUM Magazine, October 2016.

 
Voivodeships of the Polish–Lithuanian Commonwealth
Early Modern history of Ukraine
Former voivodeships of Grand Duchy of Lithuania
Geographic history of Ukraine
1566 establishments in Lithuania
1793 disestablishments in the Polish–Lithuanian Commonwealth
Bratslav
History of Podolia